Nowara is a Polish surname. Notable people with the surname include:

 Christopher Schmidt-Nowara (1966–2015), American historian
 Henryk Nowara (1924–2001), Polish boxer
 Józef Nowara (1945–1984), Polish fencer

See also
 

Polish-language surnames